The Third Amendment of the Constitution Bill 1968 was a bill (no. 5 of 1968) to amend the Constitution of Ireland to change the criteria for redistribution of constituencies for elections to Dáil Éireann, the lower house of the Oireachtas. The proposal was rejected in a referendum held on 16 October 1968.

Proposed changes to the text
The change proposed to change the text of Article 16.2.3º from:

to:

In the information supplied to voters, the subject matter of the referendum was described as follows:

Background
John O'Donovan, a Fine Gael TD, challenged the Electoral Amendment Act 1959, which had been passed by a previous Fianna Fáil government, on the basis that there were "grave inequalities" with "no relevant circumstances to justify" them. In O'Donovan v. Attorney-General (1961), the Supreme Court held that the Act was unconstitutional and suggested that the ratio of representation to population across constituencies should differ by no more than 5%. The court, interpreting the "so far as it is practicable" condition of the Constitution, suggested a 5% variation as the limit without exceptional circumstances.

The Third Amendment of the Constitution Bill 1968 proposed to specify more precisely the system of apportionment in the drawing of constituency boundaries. It would have permitted rural constituencies to elect a disproportionate number of TDs, thus allowing a degree of malapportionment. The intention was to favour rural areas which had been prone to depopulation; Fianna Fáil had a support base among the "small farmers" affected by this.

The government introduced the Fourth Amendment Bill 1968 in parallel, which would have replaced the electoral system for elections to the Dáil from proportional representation by means of the single transferable vote with the first-past-the-post voting system (FPTP) based on single-seat constituencies. A proposed constitutional amendment to introduce FPTP had been proposed by a previous Fianna Fáil government in 1959, and had been rejected in a referendum by 51.8% to 48.2%. The opposition parties Fine Gael and Labour Party described the two bills in 1968 as a combined attempt by Fianna Fáil to rig the electoral system in its favour.

Oireachtas debate
The Amendment was proposed in the Dáil by Taoiseach Jack Lynch on 21 February 1968. It passed its Second Reading on 3 April by 72 votes to 59. It passed final stages in the Dáil on 20 June. On 30 July 1968, it passed final stages in the Seanad by 26 votes to 17. Referendums on both the Third Amendment Bill and the Fourth Amendment Bill were held on 16 October 1968.

Result
The Third Amendment Bill was rejected by 656,803 (60.8%) against to 424,185 (39.2%) in favour; the Fourth Amendment, which would have altered the voting system, was rejected by a similar margin.

See also
Constitutional amendment
History of the Republic of Ireland
1968 Irish constitutional referendum
Politics of the Republic of Ireland

References

Sources

Citations

External links
Full text of the Constitution of Ireland

1968 in Irish law
1968 in Irish politics
1968 referendums
03b
03b
October 1968 events in Europe
Amendment, 03, 1968
Amendment, 03, 1968
Electoral reform referendums